Mind How You Go is the debut solo album by Skye Edwards, following her departure from Morcheeba. Despite anticipation by fans, the album achieved limited success in the UK as a result of insufficient promotion. It was more successful in other parts of Europe, particularly Poland, France, Italy and Switzerland.

Track listing
 "Love Show" (Skye Edwards, Gary Clark) – 4:03
 "Stop Complaining" (Edwards, Patrick Leonard ) – 3:37
 "Solitary" (Edwards, Leonard, Steve Gordon ) – 4:55
 "Calling" (Edwards, Gordon, Leonard) – 5:23
 "What's Wrong with Me?" (Edwards, Leonard) – 3:37
 "No Other" (Edwards, Gordon, Pascal Gabriel) – 4:04
 "Tell Me About Your Day" (Edwards, Leonard) – 4:00
 "All the Promises" (Edwards, Leonard, Gordon) – 4:08
 "Powerful" (Edwards, Gary Clark) – 4:43
 "Say Amen" (Edwards, Gordon, Leonard) – 4:31
 "Jamaica Days" (Edwards, Daniel Lanois) – 4:24

References 

2006 debut albums
Atlantic Records albums
Skye Edwards albums